The 2022 Monza Formula 3 round was a motor racing event held on 10 and 11 September 2022 at the Autodromo Nazionale di Monza, Monza, Italy. It was the ninth and final race of the 2022 FIA Formula 3 Championship, and was held in support of the 2022 Italian Grand Prix.

In a season finale under dramatic circumstances and a lot of uncertainties at the final stages of the Feature Race, Victor Martins claimed the Drivers' Championship by achieving a fourth-place finish despite receiving a five-second time penalty. The Frenchman also took benefit of several penalties from other drivers, ultimately securing fourth place to win the title by just five points to eventual race winner Zane Maloney, who took his third consecutive Feature Race victory. It was also the first time a driver from ART Grand Prix took the Drivers' Championship in modern Formula 3, after Prema Racing had previously won it in the past three seasons.

However, Prema took its crown back in the Teams' Championship after losing out on Trident in the previous season, taking its third championship in their fourth F3 season.

Driver changes 
Venezuelan driver Alessandro Famularo made his debut in the series driving for Charouz Racing System to replace David Schumacher who drove for the Czech squad in the previous round in Zandvoort.

This round also saw the comeback of American driver Hunter Yeany, who returned to the series for the season finale after suffering a broken wrist at the Spielberg round wherefore he was ruled out for four rounds.

Classification

Qualifying
Russian driver Alexander Smolyar took his second pole position of this season and a joint-record third pole position alongside Dennis Hauger and Logan Sargeant by a fine margin of 0.047 seconds ahead of Zane Maloney in second, with Roman Staněk nearly a further two-tenths adrift in third place.

Notes:
 – Juan Manuel Correa, Francesco Pizzi and Reece Ushijima all received ten-place grid penalties for the Sprint race due to failing to slow under double yellow flags. Additionally, Correa got his fastest lap time deleted.
 – Brad Benavides received a three-place grid penalty for the Sprint race for causing a collision with William Alatalo at the Feature Race in Zandvoort.

Sprint race 

Notes:
 – Brad Benavides originally finished in fourteenth, but was later given a five-second time penalty for leaving the track and gaining an advantage, demoting him to eighteenth place.
 – David Vidales stalled on the grid at the formation lap and was unable to start the race. Thus, his grid slot was left vacant.

Feature race 
The Feature Race was originally scheduled to be run for 22 laps, but was later red-flagged on lap 18 after a collision between Kush Maini and Brad Benavides, that damaged the barrier. However, race direction decided that the race would not be resumed, with the final results have been taken into account from lap 15. As a consequence, Zane Maloney won the final race of the season and took his third consecutive Feature Race win, finishing ahead of both Prema drivers Oliver Bearman and Jak Crawford.

Notes:
 – Victor Martins, William Alatalo, Jonny Edgar and Caio Collet all received five-second time penalties for exceeding track limits on multiple occasions.
 – Hunter Yeany received a five-second time penalty for forcing another driver off the track.

Final Championship standings 

Drivers' Championship standings

Teams' Championship standings

 Note: Only the top five positions are included for both sets of standings.
 Note: Bold names include the Drivers' and Teams' Champion respectively.

See also 
 2022 Italian Grand Prix
 2022 Monza Formula 2 round

Notes

References

External links 
 Official website

Monza
Monza Formula 3
Monza Formula 3